The Intelligence and Reconnaissance Directorate of the Serbian General Staff is a military intelligence unit of the Serbian Armed Forces subordinated to the General Staff. It provides operational and tactical intelligence on various topics relating to the defense of the country, including electronic warfare. 

The 224th Center for Electronic Action and Military Geographic Institute are under the direct command of the Intelligence and Reconnaissance Directorate.

See also
 Serbian Armed Forces
 Military Intelligence Agency (VOA)
 Military Security Agency (VBA)
 Security Intelligence Agency (BIA)

References

1884 establishments in Serbia
Government agencies established in 1884
Serbian intelligence agencies
Military intelligence agencies
Departments of the Serbian General Staff